Tanushree Shankar (born 16 March 1956) is an Indian dancer  and choreographer. She is based in Kolkata, India. She was a leading dancer of the Ananda Shankar Centre for Performing Arts in the 1970s and 1980s. She also acted in various films, like The Namesake.

Tanushree Shankar now leads the Tanushree Shankar Dance Company. She has evolved her own modern idiom by marrying traditional Indian dances with modern western ballet expressions. She has been inspired by her lineage as much by the folk and regional dance forms of India. She has drawn extensively from rich local Indian traditions such as the "Thang-ta" (Manipuri Sword dance).

She travels with her troupe extensively around the world. Her last notable productions include Uttaran (Upliftment of the soul) and Chirantan (The eternal) which is based on Rabindranath Tagore's music.

Family
Tanusree Shankar was born in Calcutta, her father was a doctor in Indian Army. Her husband, the late Ananda Shankar, was a music composer who experimented with fusion music. He was the son of dancers Pandit Uday Shankar and Amala Shankar and the nephew of the sitar maestro Ravi Shankar. she has a daughter Sreenanda Shankar.

Awards
 Sangeet Natak Akademi Award, 2011

References

External links
Tanusree Shankar Dance Company
Sarah Kaufman, An Indian Oasis Amid Modernity, Washington Post, published Saturday, 22 September 2007, p C05 accessed 23 September 2007

1956 births
Living people
Recipients of the Sangeet Natak Akademi Award
Indian women choreographers
Indian choreographers
Indian female martial artists
Indian female dancers
Artists from Kolkata
Indian contemporary dancers
Dancers from West Bengal
20th-century Indian dancers
20th-century Indian women artists
Women artists from West Bengal